The women's discus throw event was part of the track and field athletics programme at the 1928 Summer Olympics. It was the first medal decision of a women's event in Olympic athletics. The competition was held on Tuesday, July 31, 1928. Twenty-one discus throwers from twelve nations competed.

Records
These were the standing world and Olympic records (in metres) prior to the 1928 Summer Olympics.

In the final Halina Konopacka set a new world record with 39.62 metres.

Results

The best six throwers qualified for the final. The throwing order and the throwing series are not available. The final was held on the same day and started at 2 p.m.

References

External links
 Olympic Report
 

Discus
Discus throw at the Olympics
1928 in women's athletics
Ath